São Caetano (Portuguese for Saint Cajetan) may refer to:

Places
São Caetano (Madalena), a parish in the municipality of Madalena in the Portuguese Azores
São Caetano (Cantanhede), a parish in Cantanhede Municipality, Portugal
São Caetano do Sul, a city in the state of São Paulo, Brazil
São Caetano, Pernambuco, a city in the state of Pernambuco, Brazil

Sports
Associação Desportiva São Caetano, a Brazilian football club
São Caetano Esporte Clube, a Brazilian professional women's volleyball team